A double referendum was held in Uruguay on 25 October 2009 alongside general elections. Voters voted on two proposals: one to abolish the Law on the Expiration of the Punitive Claims of the State, which had granted amnesty for human rights abuses under the 1973–85 dictatorship during the presidencies of Juan María Bordaberry, Alberto Demicheli, Aparicio Méndez, and Gregorio Álvarez, and one to enable overseas postal voting. Both proposals were rejected by voters, with 52% rejecting the revocation of the amnesty law and 62% rejecting overseas postal voting.

Results

References

Referendums in Uruguay
2009 in Uruguay
Uruguay